Alexander Goldscheider (born June 22, 1950) is a Czech-born British composer, music producer, writer and computer specialist.

Life and career
He read music at Charles University in Prague, and received a PhD for his analysis of the music of The Beatles in 1975. Initially a music writer, critic, and radio/club DJ (1968–73), he moved into songwriting and music production, becoming a staff producer at Supraphon (1976–79), where he produced a number of pop, rock, and jazz LPs of Czech singers and bands. He pioneered the use of synthesizers in Czechoslovakia and his music was released by Panton Records and Supraphon, used on TV and in films.

He moved to London in 1981, recorded two solo albums (Themes for a One-Man-Band Vol. 1 & 2), and in 1983 worked at the BBC Radiophonic Workshop producing his own music for radio, TV, and films. Goldscheider then co-founded a music and computer company Romantic Robot, which initially designed and sold hardware (Multiprint, Videoface, Multifaces 1, 2, 3, 128 and ST) and published software (Music Typewriter, Trans-Express, Genie, Wriggler) for Sinclair Spectrum, Amstrad CPC, and Atari ST computers.

Romantic Robot became a recording label in 1991, when Goldscheider produced and released a 2-CD set of music written and performed in a Czech concentration camp –Terezín: The Music 1941-44. The set included children's opera Brundibár by Hans Krása, which has since been staged, recorded, and filmed all over the world. In addition to producing another CD (An American in Prague – Aaron Copland conducts the Czech Philharmonic Orchestra), Goldscheider has since concentrated on writing, performing, and producing his own compositions, recording classical singers, large choruses, and the Romantic Robot Orchestra on CDs such as Stabat Mater and The Song of Songs, with occasional detours into web design. In June 2018, British record company Little Beat Different released his eponymous vinyl LP Alexander Goldscheider. The first part of his memoirs Intended Coincidences was published in Prague in July 2020.

Alexander Goldscheider's grandson Ben Goldscheider is also a musician. He won the Brass Category Final of the 2016 BBC Young Musician competition, playing the French horn.

Discography and Books
 Themes for a One-Man-Band Vol. 1
 Themes for a One-Man-Band Vol. 2
 Undercurrents
 Terezín: The Music 1941–44 (produced) 
 An American in Prague (produced)
 Stabat Mater
 The Song of Songs
 Alexander Goldscheider
 Intended Coincidences

Notes

References

External links 
 Romantic Robot
 Last.fm
 MusicBrainz
 Discogs

1950 births
Living people
Czech composers
Czech male composers
Czech expatriates in the United Kingdom
Musicians from Prague
Writers from Prague
Czech male writers
Czech exiles
Czech Jews
Czech people of Russian-Jewish descent
Charles University alumni